The Tanzanian Broadcasting Corporation is a television network. 
It is Tanzania's national network and is government-owned and operated.

History

Tanzania Broadcasting Corporation (TBC) is established under the Public Corporation Act, 1992 by an Establishment Order of 2007 published vide Government Note Number 186 of 2007 (The Tanzania Broadcasting Corporation (Shirika la Utangazaji Tanzania –TBC) (Establishment) Order, 2007). By this Order, signed by the President of the United Republic of Tanzania on 24th August, 2007, the Tanzania Broadcasting Services (Taasisi ya Utangazaji Tanzania (TUT) (Establishment) Order, 2002) was revoked and then TUT ceased to exist.
TBC is a public broadcaster whose primary objective is to educate, entertain and provide information to the public. TBC is expected to fulfill its mandate through quality programming that is appealing to all citizens regardless of their ideology, race, religion, gender, class or physical disability. Since its establishment, TBC has built a relationship of trust with Tanzanians. The audience values the voice of TBC through its news and programs. 

TBC’S MAJOR HISTORICAL MILESTONES 

1) DAR ES SALAAM BROADCASTING STATION (Sauti ya Dar es Salaam) -July 1951 
• Later known as: Tanganyika Broadcasting Service 
• Coverage: Dar es Salaam 
• Colonial Development and Welfare Fund granted UKP 10,000 for the project 
• Studio equipment: One gramophone turn-table, one microphone, a mixing panel made from old public address amplifier. 
• Transmission: - Started with one short-wave transmitter 
• One standby medium-wave transmitter introduced on 10th March, 1952 
• Programs: Broadcast in Swahili for one hour 3 times a week

2) TANGANYIKA BROADCASTING CORPORATION (TBC) -1st July, 1956 
• Established by an Ordinance (Chapter 370 of the Laws Annual Supplement 1956) 
• Objective: to provide public service broadcasting as a means of information, education and entertainment with the national interest of Tanganyika. 
• The Government left programming to free judgment of the Corporation
 

3) RADIO TANZANIA – ESTABLISHED – 1st July, 1965 
• The Board of the Corporation was dissolved 
• The structure of the Corporation was changed 
• It became part of a government Ministry of Information and Tourism 

4) RADIO TANZANIA ESTABLISHED 2 STATIONS IN 1973 
• Swahili service later called ‘Idhaa ya Taifa’ or The National Service 
• English Service 
• External service
 
5) RTD EXPANSION BETWEEN  1975 - 1988 
• In 1975 Commissioned three 50 kw relay stations at Mbeya, Arusha and Mwanza. 
• In 1988 commissioned two relay stations at Dodoma and Kigoma each with 100 kw and 10kw
 
6) RTD MW EXPANSION IN 1990 
• Songea and Nachingwea relay stations with 100kw and 10kw standby

 
7) UPCOUNTRY STUDIOS IN 1991 
• At Lindi, Dodoma, Songea and Kigoma.
 
8) TV STATION BUILT AT AUDIO VISUAL INSTITUTE – 1995 
• Television ya Taifa (TVT) established under Prime Minister’s Office – 1999 
• TVT commissioned - October 1999 
• Kisarawe TV transmitter station commissioned in 1999
 
9) TAASISI YA UTANGAZAJI TANZANIA (TUT) ESTABLISHED IN 2002 
• TUT started operating as a merger of RTD and TVT – July 2004 
• 3 TV transmitter stations commissioned at Arusha, Dodoma and Mwanza in 2000. 
• Commissioned 7 TV analogue transmitter stations at Bukoba, Musoma, Tabora, Kigoma, Lindi, Tanga and Mbeya 

10) TANZANIA BROADCASTING CORPORATION (TBC) FORMED ON July 2007 
• TBC Establishment order signed by His Excellency the President of the United republic of Tanzania on 18th August, 2007 
• Singida TV and Radio transmitter stations commissioned in 2010 
       • 10 new FM radio transmitter stations established at Sumbawanga, Kilimanjaro, Shinyanga,       
        Babati, Mpanda, Tunduru, Songea, Morogoro, Iringa and Masasi in 2010/ 2011
       

Vision: 
To become a prominent, professional, culturally rooted, creative and reliable Public Service Broadcaster on the Continent.
Mission:
To empower citizens through professionally produced content that is informative, educative, entertaining, interactive as well as reflective and transformative.
Core Values:
Respect to diversity - Ukweli na Uhakika – Truth and reliability
Integrity                       - Uadilifu                       - Intergrity
Creativity                      - Uzalendo                   - Patriotism
Diligence                       - Uwajibikaji                - Accountability
Professionalism           - Weledi                       - Professionalism

Motto: 
 “Truth and Reliability” in Kiswahili it is translated as Ukweli na Uhakika.

Programming
Programming includes news and entertainment. TBC operates its television programs through 3 television profiles namely TBC 1, TBC 2 and newly established Tanzania Safari Channel (A wildlife channel). Also it operates four radio stations, TBC Taifa, TBC FM and TBC Arusha in Swahili and TBC International in English.

Stations
TBC broadcasts on three TV channels and 4 radio stations (though private television channels and radio stations also exist) and is also available via satellite and online.

See also
 Communications in Tanzania
 List of Tanzania-related topics

References

See also
 

Television stations in Tanzania
Television channels and stations established in 2001
1951 establishments in Tanganyika
Television networks